The  (English: Pegnitz Flower Society;; abbr. P.Bl.O.) is a German literary society that was founded in Nuremberg in 1644. It is the sole Baroque literary society that remains active today. The name derived from the river Pegnitz, which flows through Nuremberg.

History 

Members called themselves  (Pegnitz shepherds). The stated goal of the society was the "support and improvement of German language and poetry."

After the deaths of Klaj and Harsdörffer (1656, 1658, resp.), Sigmund von Birken revived the Society and became its director until his death in 1681. Under his leadership a total of almost 60 new members were inducted. Unusually for the time, Birken also allowed women to join; a total of 14 did so.

The 1660s and 1670s saw the society at its most fertile; its members produced many pastorals in the style of Virgil and Opitz.

After Birken's death the Society began a slow decline. Nevertheless, the society has continually maintained a membership of some sort, and remains active to this day.

Citations

Further reading 
 Irmtraud Andrian-Werburg, Eberhard Slenczka: 350 Jahre Pegnesischer Blumenorden. 1644–1994. Exhibit catalog. Nürnberg: Verlag des Germanischen Nationalmuseums, 1994, .
 Renate Jürgensen: Utile cum dulci = Mit Nutzen erfreulich. Die Blütezeit des Pegnesischen Blumenordens in Nürnberg 1644 bis 1744. Wiesbaden: Harrassowitz, 1994, .
 Jane O. Newman, Pastoral Conventions: Poetry, Language, and Thought in Seventeenth-Century Nuremberg. Baltimore: Johns Hopkins U Press, 1990, .

External links 

 Pegnesischer Blumenorden, official website
 Private site concerning the Pegnesischen Blumenorden
 History of the Pegnesischen Blumenorden

1644 establishments in the Holy Roman Empire
Learned societies of Germany
German artist groups and collectives
German writers' organisations
Nuremberg
Poetry organizations